Paul Darren Masefield  (born 21 October 1970) is an English former football right back and TV pundit who played professional football in England for a number of years before moving to Asia and playing in local Asian leagues.

Club career
Masefield started his career in the youth ranks alongside Alan Shearer at Southampton. However, he signed his first professional contract with Birmingham City and in spite of being with the club for four years (including a year with the first team), he never made a first team appearance. After brief spells with Cheltenham Town and Exeter City (on a non-contract basis), he then moved to Stockport County and Doncaster Rovers, for whom he played seven and nine matches respectively. He then played six games for Preston North End alongside future Everton manager David Moyes. He had brief spells at Bromsgrove Rovers and Limerick, with whom he was player-coach between September and November 1994.

He then moved to Hong Kong, where he played for the Sing Tao Sports Club, as well as for a Hong Kong league All-Star team and although he never represented the official Hong Kong national side, he did take on the likes of Sampdoria, Inter Milan and the Yugoslavian national side in unofficial matches. He finished off his career by playing professional football in Singapore with clubs such as Jurong, Balestier Khalsa and Tanjong Pagar United.

Post-retirement career
Masefield owns a company, Little League Malaysia that runs a coaching school for children, which attracts as many as 3000 subjects per year. He has coached Singapore Cricket Club in the second tier of Singaporean football, and is also a pundit on the ESPN Star Sports coverage of the English Premier League. He also features in Indian Super League Star Sports post coverage.

Masefield provided host broadcast commentary for the 2019 AFC Asian Cup.

Masefield currently working as an anchor in a show Football United for Indian Super League and a commentator in Indian Super League for season 2021–22.

Personal life
Masefield lives in India with his wife Stephanie and children.

References

External links
 Paul Masefield profile DoncasterRovers.co.uk
 Go east, young man When Saturday Comes

1970 births
Living people
Sportspeople from Lichfield
English footballers
Association football fullbacks
Birmingham City F.C. players
Cheltenham Town F.C. players
Exeter City F.C. players
Stockport County F.C. players
Doncaster Rovers F.C. players
Preston North End F.C. players
Bromsgrove Rovers F.C. players
Limerick F.C. players
League of Ireland players
English Football League players
Expatriate footballers in Hong Kong
Balestier Khalsa FC players
Sing Tao SC players
Jurong FC players
Tanjong Pagar United FC players
Expatriate footballers in Singapore
Singapore Premier League players
English expatriate sportspeople in Hong Kong
English expatriate footballers